Vinay Sapru is an Indian feature film, ad film and corporate films director. He runs a film production company known as Rao & Sapru, with his business partner Radhika Rao. 
Sapru directs movies and has a record of delivering different music videos.

Early life
Sapru teamed up with Radhika Rao, with whom he started a production house where he produced and directed movies, ad films, movie songs and live shows. Sapru's work is inspired by fables have a distinct Disney quality and feel to them; Lucky: No Time for Love was shot in Saint Petersburg. I Love NY in one of the five boroughs of New York City - Manhattan and Sanam Teri Kasam in the city of Mumbai and Johannesburg .

Filmography

Filmography / Feature Films - Actor/Director

Filmography / Feature Films /Actor/ Director

As Actor

Writer and Director

Ad Films

References

External links
 
 

Living people
20th-century Indian film directors
21st-century Indian film directors
Film directors from Maharashtra
Indian music video directors
Year of birth missing (living people)